William Kyree Marcus White (born 10 January 1995) is a Bermudan footballer who plays as a midfielder.

Career statistics

Club

Notes

International

References

External links
 William White at Sewanee: The University of the South
 William White at the University of Alabama at Birmingham

1995 births
Living people
Bermudian footballers
Bermudian expatriate footballers
Bermuda youth international footballers
Bermuda international footballers
Association football midfielders
UAB Blazers men's soccer players
Närpes Kraft Fotbollsförening players
Detroit City FC players
Bermudian expatriate sportspeople in the United States
Expatriate soccer players in the United States
Expatriate footballers in Finland
Kakkonen players
Sewanee Tigers men's soccer players